Baltic Days of Jewish Culture is an annual two-day festival of Jewish culture which takes place in Gdańsk, Poland at the beginning of June. The festival has been held since 1999.

The activities available during the festival include concerts, seminars, Hebrew lessons, exhibitions, meetings with prominent authors, and readings of Hebrew poetry. The festival is organized by the Social and Cultural Organization of Jews in Poland (Towarzystwo Społeczno-Kulturalne Żydów w Polsce).

See also
Festival of Jewish Culture in Warsaw
Jewish Culture Festival in Kraków

References

 Festivals in Poland
 Jewish culture
 Jews and Judaism in Poland
 Culture in Gdańsk
 Religious festivals in Poland
 Jewish festivals
 Summer events in Poland
Events in Gdańsk